Murder She Spoke II is the seventh studio album by American rapper La Chat. The album was released on April 7, 2015, by Phixieous Entertainment. The album features guest appearances from Lil Wyte, Frayser Boy, Miscellaneous and others. Murder She Spoke II is the follow-up to the 2001 Murder She Spoke album released on Three 6 Mafia’s label Hypnotize Minds.

Track listing

References

2015 albums
La Chat albums